Henry Bell was an American professional football player.  A halfback, he played football at Valdosta, Georgia, High School, and did not play college football.  Professionally, he played for the Denver Broncos of the American Football League in 1960.

See also
List of American Football League players

Denver Broncos (AFL) players
1936 births
Living people
American football halfbacks